The human gene ATP8B3 encodes the protein ATPase, aminophospholipid transporter, class I, type 8B, member 3.

The protein encoded by this gene belongs to the family of P-type cation transport ATPases, and to the subfamily of aminophospholipid-transporting ATPases. The aminophospholipid translocases transport phosphatidylserine and phosphatidylethanolamine from one side of a bilayer to another. This gene encodes the member 3 of the phospholipid-transporting ATPase 8B.

Alternatively spliced transcript variants encoding different isoforms have been found for this gene.

References

External links

Further reading 
 
 
 
 
 

EC 7.6.2